The Little Yank is a 1917 American silent historical drama film directed by George Siegmann and starring Dorothy Gish, Frank Bennett and Bob Burns. The film is set in Kentucky during the American Civil War.

Cast
 Dorothy Gish as Sallie Castleton
 Frank Bennett as Captain Johnnie 
 Bob Burns as Lieut. James Castleton
 Alberta Lee as Mrs. Castleton
 Allan Sears as Major Rushton
 Kate Toncray as Mrs. Carver 
 F.A. Turner as Wilson Carver 
 Hal Wilson as Mose

References

Bibliography
 Langman, Larry. American Film Cycles: The Silent Era. Greenwood Publishing, 1998.

External links
 

1917 films
1917 drama films
1910s English-language films
American silent feature films
Silent American drama films
Films directed by George Siegmann
American black-and-white films
Triangle Film Corporation films
Films set in Kentucky
American Civil War films
Films set in the 1860s
1910s American films